Birstall Shopping Park is a shopping park located in Birstall, Batley, West Yorkshire, England. It contains a wide variety of retailers and includes the region's only IKEA store. Adjacent is another retail park, Junction 27 Retail Park, specialising in bulky goods and electronics. The section of the park containing retailers Pets at Home and Homesense is known as Spring Ram Retail Park, and was built slightly later than the rest of the complex but is under common ownership.

Gallery

References

External links

Official website 
Buildings and structures in Kirklees
Retail parks in the United Kingdom
Birstall, West Yorkshire